The 1925 All-Big Ten Conference football team consists of American football players selected to the All-Big Ten Conference teams chosen by various selectors for the 1925 Big Ten Conference football season.

All Big-Ten selections

Ends
 Bennie Oosterbaan, Michigan (AP-1; BE-1; BTW-1; NB-1; JW; UP-1; WE-1)
 Chuck Kassel, Illinois (AP-1; BE-1; BTW-1; UP-1; WE-1)
 Dick Romey, Iowa (AP-2; BE-2; JW; NB-1; WE-3)
 George Fisher, Indiana (BE-2)
 Jefferson Burrus, Wisconsin (BTW-2; UP-2)
 Roger B. Wheeler, Minnesota (BTW-2)
 Cookie Cunningham, Ohio State (AP-2)
 Elmer A. Lampe, Chicago (WE-2)
 William Flora, Michigan (WE-2)
 Frank E. Mathews, Northwestern (WE-3)

Tackles
 Henderson, Chicago (AP-1; BE-1; BTW-1; JW; NB-1; UP-1; WE-1)
 Tom Edwards, Michigan (AP-2; BE-2; BTW-1; NB-1; UP-1; WE-1)
 Harry Hawkins, Michigan (AP-1; BE-1; BTW-1; JW; UP-2; WE-2)
 Elmer A. Lampe, Chicago (BE-2; UP-2 [end])
 Paul Nelson, Wisconsin (BTW-2; WE-3)
 J. T. Bolan, Purdue (UP-2)
 John H. Nichols, Ohio State (AP-2)
 Charles A. Brown, Illinois (WE-2)
 Hobscheid, Chicago (WE-3)

Guards
 Ed Hess, Ohio State (AP-1; BE-1; BTW-1; JW; NB-1; UP-1; WE-1)
 Bernie Shively, Illinois (AP-1; BE-1; JW)
 Sam Hibben, Chicago (NB-1)
 Ray J. Stipek, Wisconsin (AP-2; BE-2; BTW-2; WE-2)
 Len Walsh, Minnesota (BE-2; WE-1)
 John Lovette, Michigan (BTW-2; WE-3)
 Paul Kraguski, Iowa (UP-2, WE-3)
 Merwin Mitterwallner, Illinois (UP-2; WE-2)

Centers
 Robert J. Brown, Michigan (AP-1; BE-1; BTW-1 [guard]; JW; NB-1; UP-1 [guard]; WE-2)
 Tim Lowry, Northwestern (AP-2; BE-2; BTW-1; UP-1; WE-1)
 Alex W. Klein, Ohio State (BTW-2)
 Hal Griffen, Iowa (AP-2 [guard], UP-2)
 Robert Reitsch, Illinois (WE-3)

Quarterbacks
 Benny Friedman, Michigan (AP-1; BE-1; BTW-1; JW; UP-1; WE-1)
 Mel Taube, Purdue (BE-2)
 John Schirmer, Iowa (WE-2)

Halfbacks
 Red Grange, Illinois (AP-1; BE-1; BTW-1; NB-1 [quarterback]; JW; UP-1; WE-1)
 McCarty, Chicago (AP-1; BE-1; BTW-1 [fullback]; WE-1 [fullback])
 Wesley Fry, Iowa (AP-2 [fullback]; UP-1)
 Ralph Baker, Northwestern (NB-1)
 Harold Almquist, Minnesota (BTW-1; UP-2; WE-3 [qb])
 Marty Karow, Ohio State (BE-2; JW; WE-2)
 Nick Kutsch, Iowa (BTW-2 [quarterback]; NB-1; WE-3)
 Doyle Harmon, Wisconsin (AP-2; BE-2; UP-2 [quarterback]; WE-1)
 Chester "Cotton" Wilcox, Purdue (AP-2 [quarterback]; BTW-2 , WE-3)
 Lawrence E. Marks, Indiana (WE-2)

Fullbacks
 Loren L. Lewis, Northwestern (AP-1; BE-2; BTW-2 [halfback]; UP-1; WE-2)
 Herb Joesting, Minnesota (AP-2; BE-1; UP-2)
 Bo Molenda, Michigan (BTW-2; NB-1; UP-2 [halfback]; WE-3)
 Earl Britton, Illinois (JW)

See also
 1925 College Football All-America Team
 1925 All-Western college football team

Key

AP = Associated Press, "as selected by seven of the Big Ten coaches, for the Associated Press tonight"

BE = Billy Evans with counsel from nine of the ten Big Ten coaches

BTW = Big Ten Weekly, selected by Albon Holden in the Big Ten Weekly, a publication devoted entirely to the athletics of the leading institutions of the west"

JW = John Wilce, head coach at Ohio State

NB = Norman E. Brown, sports editor of the Central Press Association

UP = United Press, "according to a consensus of opinion as expressed by coaches, trainers, athletic directors, and critics as compiled today by the United Press"

WE = Walter Eckersall

Bold = consensus first-team selection by at least three of the six selectors listed above

References

1925 Big Ten Conference football season
All-Big Ten Conference football teams